, abbreviated to , is a national university in Japan.  The main campus is located in Aramaki-machi, Maebashi City, Gunma Prefecture.

History 

Below are the histories of the predecessors of Gunma University (GU):

Maebashi College of Medical Science 
In 1948, the college was reorganized into Maebashi College of Medical Science, a four-year college (age 19-23 or above). In 1949 the college was merged into Gunma University to constitute the Faculty of Medicine. The campus was located in Showa-machi, Maebashi (GU Showa Campus today).

Kiryu Technical College 

The college was located in the town of Kiryu, whose main industry was textile manufacturing. In 1920 the college was renamed  with the Department of Applied Chemistry added. Departments of mechanics and electronics were also later added. In 1944 the college was renamed, in Japanese,  (桐生工業専門学校).

In 1949 the college was merged into Gunma University to constitute the Faculty of Engineering. The campus was located in Tenjin-cho, Kiryu (GU Kiryu Campus today). The former main building of the college is partly preserved as the Alumni Memorial Hall (removed to the present position in 1972 to allow construction of a new building with RC).

Gunma Normal School 
Gunma Normal School was founded in February 1873 as the Training Center For Elementary School Teachers by Gunma Prefecture government. The center was located in Maebashi. In June 1873 Gunma Prefecture was merged with a part of present-day Saitama Prefecture to constitute Kumagaya Prefecture. The training center was renamed  and removed to Honjo, and then to Kumagaya. In September 1876 the school was removed to Takasaki and renamed , for the present-day Gunma Prefecture was established in August 1876. In October 1876 the school was removed again to Maebashi, from then on Maebashi was home to the school.

The normal school underwent several removals and renamings. In 1901 Gunma Girls' Normal School was established, and the Normal School of Gunma Prefecture became a boys' school. In 1943 the two prefectural normal schools (boys' and girls') were merged into Gunma Normal School, a national college: the men's department was located in Hiyoshi-cho, Maebashi and the women's department was in Wakamiya-cho, Maebashi. In 1949 the normal school was merged into Gunma University to constitute the Faculty of Liberal Arts (renamed Faculty of Education in 1966).

The Faculty of Education was removed to newborn Aramaki Campus in 1970, and former Hiyoshi Campus was abolished; former Wakamiya Campus is used by the GU-attached Elementary School and the School for Children with Special Needs.

Gunma Youth Normal School 
Gunma Youth Normal School was founded in 1918 as Agricultural Training School (one-year school), which was attached to the Normal School of Gunma Prefecture. The purpose of the school was to nurture agricultural teachers. The school was later renamed Gunma Prefectural Training Center for Teachers of Adolescent Youth (a two-year school) in 1935. In 1944 the Training Center was reorganized into Gunma Youth Normal School, a national college. The school was removed to Takasaki to have an independent campus. Finally in 1947 the school got its campus in the former site of the Army. In 1949 the normal school was merged into Gunma University to constitute the Faculty of Liberal Arts (renamed Faculty of Education in 1966). In 1951 Takasaki Campus was abolished (see Takasaki City University of Economics).

Faculties 
 Cooperative Faculty of Education (in Aramaki Campus)
 Faculty of Social and Information Studies (in Aramaki Campus)
 Faculty of Informatics (in Aramaki Campus)
 Faculty of Medicine, School of Medicine, School of Health Sciences (in Showa Campus)
 School of Science and Technology (in Kiryu Campus)

Graduate Schools 
 Graduate School of Education (Master's courses only)
 Graduate School of Social and Information Studies (Master's courses only)
 Graduate School of Medicine (Master's/Doctoral)
 Graduate School of Health Sciences (Master's/Doctoral)
 Graduate School of Science and Technology (Master's/Doctoral)

Institutes 
 Library and Information Technology Center
 University Hospital (in Showa Campus)
 Institute for Molecular and Cellular Regulation (in Showa Campus)
 Biosignal Genome Resource Center
 Joint Facilities for Research and Education
 Heavy Ion Medical Center (in Showa Campus)
 Advanced Technology Research Center (in Kiryu Campus)
 Innovative Center for Cooperative Research (in Kiryu Campus)
 Center for Material Research by Instrumental Analysis (in Kiryu Campus)

Sister universities
 Taiwan
National Formosa University

References

External links 
 
 Gunma University Youtube Official Channel 

Japanese national universities
Universities and colleges in Gunma Prefecture
1949 establishments in Japan
Educational institutions established in 1949
Maebashi